This is a list of the NCAA Division I Outdoor Track and Field Champions in the javelin throw.  Measurements were conducted in imperial distances (feet and inches) until 1975.  Metrication occurred in 1976, so all subsequent championships were measured in metric distances. International javelin design regulations were changed in 1986 with the center of gravity of the implement moved forward. As a result, throwing distances were in general shorter, flat landings fewer, and legal throws (tip-down) easier to attain post-1985.

Champions
Key
* = Old javelin
A = Altitude assisted

References

GBR Athletics

External links
NCAA Division I men's outdoor track and field

Javelin NCAA Men's Division I Outdoor Track and Field Championships
Outdoor track, men
Javelin